Mr. Penumbra's 24-Hour Bookstore is a 2012 novel by American writer Robin Sloan. It was chosen as one of the best 100 books of 2012 by the San Francisco Chronicle, was a New York Times Editor's Choice, and was on the New York Times Hardcover Fiction Best Seller list as well as the NPR Hardcover Fiction Bestseller List. The US book cover, which glows in the dark, was done by Rodrigo Corral and chosen as one of the 25 best book covers for 2012 by BookPage.

Mr. Penumbra's 24-Hour Bookstore combines elements of fantasy, mystery, friendship and adventure as a way of looking at the modern conflict and transition between new technology (electronic) and old (print books). The protagonist is a laid-off Silicon Valley tech worker who begins working at a dusty bookstore with very few customers, only to start discovering one secret after another. The mysterious old books, along with the store's owner, lead to a 500-year-old secret society.

A prequel novelette, Ajax Penumbra 1969, was published in 2012.

He was inspired to write the story after a friend misread a sign claiming the existence of a "24 hour bookshop".

Characters 

 Clay Jannon - is the lead protagonist in Mr. Penumbra's 24-Hour Bookstore. At the beginning of Robert Sloan's novel, he is an unemployed software developer that just recently lost his job at a startup. After losing his job, Clay stumbled upon a 24-hour Bookstore with a HELP WANTED sign posted in the window. He decided to apply and was hired to work really late night shifts. Slate.com describes Clay as, " a sort of Bay Area everyman—tech-savvy, aimless, and possessing of a clutch of brilliant friends with high-powered jobs. "
 Kat Potente - is an employee at Google who helps Clay out with trying to decipher the books. She found her way to the 24-hour bookstore with an online ad, and then over time becomes Clay's romantic interest throughout the novel. Throughout the novel, she repeatedly uses her job to her advantage, using all of the large tech company's resources.
 Neel Shah - is Clay's childhood friend that happens to be very wealthy and owns a large tech company. Neel is very intrigued with the mystery and decides helps Clay throughout the novel to decipher certain parts of the books.

Reviews 

 The New York Times Sunday Book Review said this about Mr. Penumbra's 24-hour bookstore, it "dexterously tackles the intersection between old technologies and new with a novel that is part love letter to books, part technological meditation, part thrilling adventure, part requiem." The review continues to give a general explanation of what the principals of the story have to offer, leading into a summary of the plot of the novel. This is then followed by what the author's personal opinions were about Sloan's novel, which a quote was taken from above.
 The Boston Globe Review tells prospective readers Mr. Penumbra's 24-Hour Bookstore "is worth a read for anyone who has wondered about the epochal changes wrought by the digital revolution."  This review gives a more broad idea of what someone could expect from reading this book, along with describing the main characters, the reviewer also states, "the novel engages with certain questions about technology, humanity, and our attempts at a kind of immortality."
 The Hindu describes Mr. Penumbra's 24-Hour bookstore as "A biblio-thriller for the typophile lurking inside all of us." This review gives a general description of the thematic events that happen along the story, while also referencing the language Sloan used to craft the novel. The review ends with the article stating, "What Sloan accomplishes by the end is give the reader of digital books a glimpse of the debt ebooks owe to the master typographers of the printed book."
 Slate.com begins by describing Robin Sloan's book as "a fantasy novel, though the fantasy occurs mainly at the edges; most of the story is set in a hyper-realistic version of present-day San Francisco." Then the review begins describing the characters of the story, followed by a plot overline, along with the author given their opinions on how realistic the book is. The review ends with the author noting Sloan, "seems to skirt many of the novel’s questions about how digitizing art changes."
 Bookreporter.com had a very positive review of Robin Sloan's novel. The author explained that while reading Mr. Penumbra's 24-Hour Bookstore they, "haven’t had this much fun reading a book since the first Harry Potter was released. It’s a literary adventure full of imaginary companies, websites, books, authors and games interwoven with real ones." The review gives a general overview of the main characters along with the plot, followed by the author giving their ideas about the novel which are quoted above.
 Booklore.com describes Mr. Penumbra's 24-Hour Bookstore as, "an entirely charming and lovable first novel of mysterious books and dusty bookshops." This review gave the novel an overall 8/10, and praised Robin Sloan for integrating historical and modern culture. The review also gives a general overview of the plot, while not giving out to many details of how the story ends.
 Npr titled their review of Mr. Penumbra's 24-Hour Bookstore as "Page And Screen Make Peace In 'Mr. Penumbra'". This review gave more background on Robin Sloan as a writer, mentioning that he is new to the fiction genre and has a passion both for technology and writing. The review is rounded off with a sentiment of, "Mr. Penumbra's 24-Hour Bookstore reminds us of the miracle of reading, no matter how you choose to do it."

References

External links
 Author's website
 New York Times Sunday Book Review
 New York Times review
 Boston Globe review
 The Hindu review
 Slate review
 BookLore review

2012 American novels
Novels set in San Francisco
Farrar, Straus and Giroux books
Books with cover art by Rodrigo Corral
2012 debut novels
Bookstores in fiction